Amir Al-Ammari (born 27 July 1997) is a professional footballer who plays as a midfielder for Allsvenskan club Halmstads BK, on loan from IFK Göteborg, and the Iraq national team. Born in Sweden, he represented them at youth level before switching his allegiance to Iraq.

Club career
Al-Ammari started his youth career with Swedish clubs IFK Öxnehaga and Husqvarna FF, before moving to Denmark to join youth academy of Brøndby IF.

Al-Ammari returned to Husqvarna in March 2017, where he started his senior career. On 11 December 2017, Jönköpings Södra IF announced the signing of Al-Ammari on a three-year deal. He left the club in December 2020 following the conclusion of 2020 Superettan season.

On 14 February 2021, newly promoted Allsvenskan side Halmstads BK announced the signing of Al-Ammari. He made his professional debut on 11 April 2021 in a 1–0 win against BK Häcken.

International career
Born in Sweden, Al-Ammari is eligible to play for Iraq through his father.

Sweden U19
He has played four friendlies for Sweden under-19 team in 2014 and 2015.

Iraq U23
In March 2019, Al-Ammari played for Iraq under-23 team in 2020 AFC U-23 Championship qualifiers. He scored two goals from three matches and helped his team qualify for the main tournament. In January 2020, he was selected in Iraq's squad for 2020 AFC U-23 Championship.

Iraq
On 2 September 2021, Al-Ammari made his first international cap with Iraq against South Korea in the 2022 World Cup qualifiers.

Career statistics

Club

International

Scores and results list Iraq's goal tally first, score column indicates score after each Al-Ammari goal.

Honours

International
Iraq
 Arabian Gulf Cup: 2023

See also
 List of Iraq international footballers

References

External links
 
 

1997 births
Living people
Association football midfielders
Swedish footballers
Iraqi footballers
Iraq international footballers
Sweden youth international footballers
Iraq youth international footballers
Allsvenskan players
Superettan players
Ettan Fotboll players
Husqvarna FF players
Jönköpings Södra IF players
Halmstads BK players
IFK Göteborg players
Mjällby AIF players
Swedish people of Iraqi descent
Iraqi people of Palestinian descent
Sportspeople from Jönköping